Abra is a populated place in Balochistan, Pakistan.

See also
Lohi

References

Populated places in Balochistan, Pakistan